The Amazing Pudding was a British fan magazine devoted to Pink Floyd.

The Amazing Pudding  may also refer to:

 An early title for the Pink Floyd work "Atom Heart Mother"
 The Amazing Pudding (album), 1998 bootleg album